Guangzhou International Sports Arena is an indoor arena located in Guangzhou, China that was completed in September 2010. It is used mostly for basketball and it has a seating capacity of 18,000 spectators. On October 16, 2010, it hosted an NBA pre-season game between the New Jersey Nets and Houston Rockets. A sellout crowd attended this game as Houston beat New Jersey, 95–86.

History
Designed by MANICA Architecture in partnership with the Guangzhou Design Institute, the Guangzhou Arena not only hosted the Asian Games events in 2010, but is home to a wide variety of events such as basketball, international ice events, and major music concerts. The building's design also specifically accommodates the standards of the NBA, a feature that will allow it to become home to the league's expansion throughout Asia.

The arena is planned as part of a larger Sport and Entertainment District in the heart of the new Luogang District to the East of downtown Guangzhou.

Notable Events
On 23 September 2011, Irish vocal pop band Westlife held a concert for Gravity Tour supporting their album Gravity.

On 18 April 2015, American singer-songwriter Katy Perry performed her first show of her Asian leg of the Prismatic World Tour at the arena. This was also her very first show in China.

On 3 June 2017, Joker Xue, a Chinese singer-songwriter, headlined the arena as part of his I Think I've Seen You Somewhere Tour.

On 30 August 2017, Ariana Grande performed at this arena for the first time as part of the Dangerous Woman Tour.

See also
List of indoor arenas in China

References

External links

Venue information

Indoor arenas in China
Basketball venues in China
Sports venues in Guangzhou
Huangpu District, Guangzhou
Venues of the 2010 Asian Games
Asian Games basketball venues